Samolshinsky is a rural locality (a khutor) and the administrative center of Samolshinskoye Rural Settlement, Alexeyevsky District, Volgograd Oblast, Russia. The population was 413 as of 2010.

Geography 
Samolshinsky is located 15 km northwest of Alexeyevskaya (the district's administrative centre) by road. Pimkinsky is the nearest rural locality.

References 

Rural localities in Alexeyevsky District, Volgograd Oblast